Bagisara brouana is a moth of the family Noctuidae first described by Alexander Douglas Campbell Ferguson in 1997. It is found in the US states of Louisiana and Mississippi.

It has a very limited distribution, which might indicate it feeds on a single genus or even species of plant which also has a limited distribution.

External links
"Review of the New World Bagisarinae with Description of Two New from the Southern United States (Noctuidae)".
Image

Bagisarinae
Moths described in 1997